The Radical Party of the Serbs in Macedonia (Radikalna stranka na Srbite vo Makedonija, RSSM) was a political party in the Republic of Macedonia. It is the Macedonian branch of the Serbian Radical Party. It won 0.4% of the vote in the 2008 parliamentary election.

References

Serb political parties in North Macedonia
Serbian Radical Party
Conservative parties in North Macedonia